Gopiganj is a town and a municipal board in Sant Ravidas Nagar district in the Indian state of Uttar Pradesh. It is located beside the river Ganges, almost equidistant from Prayagraj and Varanasi on National Highway 2.

Demographics
At the 2001 India census, Gopiganj had a population of 17,938 (males 52%, females 48%). Gopiganj had an average literacy rate of 63%, higher than the national average of 59.5%: male literacy was 69% and female literacy 55%. 16% of the population were under 6 years of age.

Educational institutions
 St. Thomas School Gopiganj (Affiliated to ICSE Board New Delhi) (est. 1985),
 Kashinaresh Postgraduate College (Gyanpur), 
 D.W. Punj Model School (Sitamarhi)
 Lakshay Computer Institute padav Gopiganj

References

Cities and towns in Bhadohi district